Cardanolide is a steroid with a molecular weight of 344.531.

See also
 Cardiac glycoside

External links
 

Steroids